Sailors on Leave is a 1941 American musical film directed by Albert S. Rogell and written by Art Arthur and Malcolm Stuart Boylan. The film stars William Lundigan, Shirley Ross, Chick Chandler, Ruth Donnelly, Mae Clarke and Cliff Nazarro. The film was released on September 30, 1941, by Republic Pictures.

Plot
Chuck Stephens is fooled by his sailor pals Swifty and Mike into believing (and betting on) that if he marries by his 27th birthday, he will inherit $25,000. With only days to go before his deadline, a frantic Chuck is taken to Aunt Navy's nightclub in San Pedro, California and introduced to singer Linda Hall, making a bad first impression.

Linda eventually grows more interested in Chuck, but ends up arrested after a bracelet he gives her as a gift turns out to be stolen. Chuck considers marrying other women rounded up by the guys, but realizes he loves Linda after all. He marries her after the deadline, but unexpectedly gets a $5,000 reward for recovering the stolen bracelet.

Cast 
William Lundigan as Chuck Stephens
Shirley Ross as Linda Hall
Chick Chandler as Swifty
Ruth Donnelly as Aunt Navy
Mae Clarke as Gwen
Cliff Nazarro as Mike
Tom Kennedy as Dugan
Mary Ainslee as Sadie
Bill Shirley as Bill Carstairs
Garry Owen as Thompson
William Haade as Sawyer
Jane Kean as Sunshine

References

External links
 

1941 films
1940s English-language films
American musical films
1941 musical films
Republic Pictures films
Films directed by Albert S. Rogell
American black-and-white films
1940s American films